William Lindsay Lewis (29 March 1931 – 12 November 2015) was a Scottish footballer who played mainly as a centre half for Morton  (making over 100 appearances in all competitions) and Third Lanark (achieving a promotion to the top tier in 1956–57, playing on the losing side in the 1959 Scottish League Cup Final, helping the club to a third-place finish in the 1960–61 Scottish Division One campaign, and winning the Glasgow Cup in the 1962–63 season).

He began his career – playing in a more attacking position – in junior football with Irvine Meadow, a club his son Rab also played for in the 1970s with some success.

References

1931 births
2015 deaths
Footballers from North Ayrshire
Association football central defenders
Scottish footballers
Third Lanark A.C. players
Greenock Morton F.C. players
Irvine Meadow XI F.C. players
Scottish Junior Football Association players
Scottish Football League players
People from Kilwinning